Darè (Daré in local dialect) was a comune (municipality) in Trentino in the northern Italian region Trentino-Alto Adige/Südtirol, located about  west of Trento. It was merged with Villa Rendena and Vigo Rendena on January 1, 2016, to form a new municipality, Porte di Rendena.

Cities and towns in Trentino-Alto Adige/Südtirol